

Until the period of the First Aliyah

In 1561, Tiberias was reestablished. During the same year Gracia Mendes Nasi and Joseph Nasi established in addition to Tiberias seven more Jewish villages.
At the start of the 19th century, a group of students of the Vilna Gaon immigrated to the land of Israel and renewed the Jewish settlement in Safed and surrounding area, and reinforced the Jewish settlement in Jerusalem and Hebron.
In 1860 Jewish neighborhoods were first established outside of the walls of the Old City of Jerusalem.
In 1870, the first Jewish agricultural school, Mikveh Israel was established.

In addition to Jewish immigrants, others immigrated to land of Israel as well. In 1867, with the conclusion of the construction of the Suez Canal, many of the Egyptian workers could not to return to their homes in Egypt, which had been occupied by their brothers during their absence, and many of them settled in the land of Israel. In 1857, the Ottoman authorities encouraged people from all over the world to come and inhabit the land. American colonists, German Templars, and Algerian refugees (who fled a coup) answered the call. Amongst them was the al-Husayni clan, the family of Mohammad Amin al-Husayni. During the same period Chechen and Bosnian immigrants also immigrated to the country.

During the period of the First Aliyah 1882-1904

During the period of the Second Aliyah 1904 - 1914

During the period of the British Mandate of Palestine 1917 - 1948

Since the Declaration of Independence and until the Six-Day War 1948 - 1967

1967 - 2011

See also
Israeli settlement timeline
History of the Jews in the Land of Israel
Yom HaAliyah

References

History of Palestine (region)
Populated places in Israel
Aliyah
History of Zionism